Acanthothecis aurantiacodiscus is a species of corticolous lichen in the family Graphidaceae. Found in Sri Lanka, it was formally described as a new species in 2014 by lichenologists Gothamie Weerakoon, Robert Lücking, and Helge Thorsten Lumbsch. It is only known to occur at the type locality. The specific epithet aurantiacodiscus  refers to the orange-coloured disc of the ascomata. Acanthothecis aurantiacodiscus contains the secondary compound norstictic acid. It has relatively large muriform ascospores, measuring 45–50 by 12–15 μm. These last two features distinguish it from most other Acanthothecis species.

References

aurantiacodiscus
Lichen species
Lichens of Sri Lanka
Lichens described in 2014
Taxa named by Helge Thorsten Lumbsch
Taxa named by Robert Lücking
Taxa named by Gothamie Weerakoon